Horatio Rogers Jr. (May 18, 1836 – November 12, 1904) was an American lawyer, judge, and Union Army officer in the American Civil War. He was the Attorney General of Rhode Island from 1864 to 1867 and again from 1888 to 1889. From 1891 to 1903, he served as an Associate Justice of the Rhode Island Supreme Court.

Early life and family 
Rogers was born on May 18, 1836 in Providence, Rhode Island, United States. He was the son of Susan (née Curtis) and Horatio Rogers Sr., and had an older brother, John Henry, who became an Episcopal priest. He attended Brown University as an undergraduate, before going on to earn his Legum Doctor elsewhere.

Civil War 

During the American Civil War, Rogers first served as a major of the 3rd Rhode Island Heavy Artillery, then as a colonel of the 11th Rhode Island Infantry, and finally as a colonel and commander of the 2nd Rhode Island Infantry. He commanded the 2nd Rhode Island at the Battle of Gettysburg. After the battle, he wrote, "Death seemed to be holding a carnival."

He resigned from the Army on January 14, 1864.  On March 13, 1865, he was brevetted brigadier general, US Volunteers, for "gallant and meritorious service during the war."

Law career 
After returning from the war, Rogers became a prominent lawyer and jurist. In 1864, he ran for Attorney General of Rhode Island. He was nominated on March 15, 1864 by the Rhode Island National Union (Republican) Convention. On election day on April 6, won with 96% of the vote, receiving 10,395 votes against Walter S. Burges' 284 and 123 other votes. He served until 1867 and again from 1888 to 1889. He also worked as a partner in his manufacturing company of his father-in-law, James Y. Smith. In 1891, he was appointed to a newly created seat as an Associate Justice of the Rhode Island Supreme Court, serving until 1903.

Death 
Rogers died on November 12, 1904, aged 68. He was buried in Swan Point Cemetery in Providence, with both of his wives buried on either side.

Personal life 
Rogers was married twice. His first wife, Lucia Waterman, died in 1867, and the couple had Arthur, who became an Episcopal priest and died in 1938, and Lucian Waterman, who died in 1927. His second wife, Emily Priscilla Smith, was the daughter of James Y. Smith, who was Mayor of Providence and Governor of Rhode Island. In 1864, Rogers and Smith had one child, Emily Priscilla Smith Rogers.

The Rogers family lived in a Queen Anne style house at 264 Bowen Street in Providence. It was built for Rogers in 1887 to a design by noted Providence architect Alpheus C. Morse.

Works 
In addition to his legal profession, Rogers was a member of the American Antiquarian Society and authored several books during his lifetime. His best-known work was Private Libraries of Providence, which included sketches and descriptions of libraries in Providence homes, at a time when common access to libraries was uncommon. In addition to information on his own library, the book contained entries on the private libraries of some of Rhode Island's most prominent citizens, including John Russell Bartlett, Royal C. Taft, and John Carter Brown's library.

They are listed as follows:

References 

1836 births
1904 deaths
19th-century biographers
19th-century American Episcopalians
19th-century American judges
19th-century American lawyers
19th-century American writers
20th-century American Episcopalians
20th-century American judges
20th-century American lawyers
American people of English descent
Brown University alumni
Burials at Swan Point Cemetery
Businesspeople from Providence, Rhode Island
Lawyers from Providence, Rhode Island
People of Rhode Island in the American Civil War
Rhode Island Attorneys General
Rhode Island Republicans
Justices of the Rhode Island Supreme Court
Union Army colonels
Writers from Providence, Rhode Island
19th-century American businesspeople